Annekathrin Bürger (born 1937) is a German stage, film and television actress. Bürger was a prominent actress in East Germany appearing in a number of films made by the state-run DEFA film studios as well as in television series such as Wolf Among Wolves (1965) set in 1920s Berlin. In 1972 she played the female lead in the Red Western Tecumseh.

Personal life
She was married to actor Rolf Römer.

Selected filmography

Film
 A Berlin Romance (1956)
 Reportage 57 (1959)
 Love's Confusion (1959)
 Five Days, Five Nights (1960)
 September Love (1961)
 Star-Crossed Lovers (1962)
 The Second Track (1962)
 Tecumseh (1972)

References

Bibliography 
 Campbell, Russell. Marked Women: Prostitutes and Prostitution in the Cinema. University of Wisconsin Press, 2006.

External links 
 

1937 births
Living people
German stage actresses
German television actresses
German film actresses
Actresses from Berlin
East German actors
East German women
20th-century German women